The Great Famine of 1315–1317 (occasionally dated 1315–1322) was the first of a series of large-scale crises that struck Europe early in the 14th century. Most of Europe (extending east to Russia and south to Italy) was affected. The famine caused many deaths over an extended number of years and marked a clear end to the period of growth and prosperity from the 11th to the 13th centuries. 

The Great Famine started with bad weather in spring 1315. Crop failures lasted through 1316 until the summer harvest in 1317, and Europe did not fully recover until 1322. Crop failures were not the only problem; cattle disease caused sheep and cattle numbers to fall as much as 80%. The period was marked by extreme levels of crime, disease, mass death, and even cannibalism and infanticide. The crisis had consequences for the Church, state, European society, and for future calamities to follow in the 14th century.

Background
Famines were familiar occurrences in medieval Europe. For example, localised famines occurred in the Kingdom of France during the 14th century in 1304, 1305, 1310, 1315–1317 (the Great Famine), 1330–1334, 1349–1351, 1358–1360, 1371, 1374–1375, and 1390. In the Kingdom of England, the most prosperous kingdom affected by the Great Famine, there were additional famines in 1321, 1351, and 1369. For most people there was often not enough to eat, and life was a relatively short and brutal struggle to survive to old age. According to official records about the English royal family, an example of the best off in society, for whom records were kept, the average life expectancy at birth in 1276 was 35.28 years. Between 1301 and 1325, during the Great Famine it was 29.84 years, but between 1348 and 1375 during the Plague, it was only 17.33 years. It demonstrates the relatively steep population drop between 1348 and 1375 of about 42%.

During the Medieval Warm Period (10th to 13th centuries), the population of Europe exploded compared to prior eras and reached levels that were not matched again in some places until the 19th century. Indeed, parts of rural France are still less populous than in the early 14th century. The yield ratios of wheat (the number of seeds one could harvest and consume per seed planted) had been dropping since 1280, and food prices had been increasing. After favourable harvests, the ratio could be as high as 7:1, but after unfavourable harvests it was as low as 2:1—that is, for every seed planted, two seeds were harvested, one for next year's seed, and one for food. By comparison, modern farming has ratios of 30:1 or more (see agricultural productivity).

The onset of the Great Famine followed the end of the Medieval Warm Period. Between 1310 and 1330, Northern Europe saw some of the worst and most sustained periods of bad weather in the Middle Ages, characterized by severe winters and rainy and cold summers. The Great Famine may have been precipitated by a volcanic event and occurred during the Little Ice Age. Changing weather patterns, the ineffectiveness of medieval governments in dealing with crises, and population level at a historical high made it a time with little margin for error in food production.

Great Famine

In the spring of 1315, unusually heavy rain began in much of Europe. Throughout the spring and the summer, it continued to rain, and the temperature remained cool. Under such conditions, grain could not ripen, leading to widespread crop failures. Grains were brought indoors in urns and pots to keep dry. The straw and hay for the animals could not be cured, so there was no fodder for the livestock. In England, lowlands in Yorkshire and Nottingham were flooded, while stew ponds on the River Foss in Yorkshire were washed away.

The price of food began to rise. Prices in England doubled between spring and midsummer. Salt, the only way to cure and preserve meat, was difficult to obtain because brine could not be effectively evaporated in wet weather. Its price increased from 30 to 40 shillings. In Lorraine, wheat prices rose by 320%, making bread unaffordable to peasants. Stores of grain for long-term emergencies were limited to royalty, lords, nobles, wealthy merchants, and the Church. Because of the general increased population pressures, even lower-than-average harvests meant some people would go hungry; there was little margin for failure. People began to harvest wild edible roots, grasses, nuts, and bark in the forests.

A number of documented incidents show the extent of the famine. Edward II of England stopped at St Albans on 10 August 1315 and had difficulty finding bread for himself and his entourage; it was a rare occasion in which the king of England was unable to eat. In Bristol, the city's chronicles reported that in 1315 there was: 'a great Famine of Dearth with such mortality that the living could scarce suffice to bury the dead, horse flesh and dogs flesh was accounted good meat, and some eat their own children. The thieves that were in Prison did pluck and tear in pieces, such as were newly put into prison and devoured them half alive.'

The French, under Louis X, tried to invade Flanders, but in low-lying areas of the Netherlands, the fields were soaked and the army became bogged down and were forced to retreat, burning their provisions where they abandoned them, unable to carry them away.

In spring 1316, it continued to rain on a European population deprived of energy and reserves to sustain itself. All segments of society from nobles to peasants were affected but especially the peasants, who represented 95% of the population and who had no reserve food supplies. To provide some measure of relief, the future was mortgaged by slaughtering the draft animals, eating the seed grain, abandoning children to fend for themselves (see "Hansel and Gretel") and, among old people, voluntarily refusing food for the younger generation to survive. The chroniclers of the time noted many incidents of cannibalism, although "one can never tell if such talk was not simply a matter of rumor-mongering".

The height of the famine was in 1317, as the wet weather continued. In that summer, the weather returned to normal patterns. By then, people were so weakened by diseases such as pneumonia, bronchitis, and tuberculosis, and so much of the seed stock had been eaten, that it was not until 1325 that the food supply returned to relatively normal levels and the population began to increase. Historians debate the toll, but it is estimated that 10–25% of the population of many cities and towns died. Though the Black Death (1347–1351) would kill more people, it often swept through an area in a matter of months, whereas the Great Famine lingered for years, prolonging the suffering of the populace.

Jean-Pierre Leguay noted the Great Famine "produced wholesale slaughter in a world that was already overcrowded, especially in the towns, which were natural outlets for rural overpopulation." Estimates of death rates vary by place, but some examples include a loss of 10–15% in the south of England. Northern France lost about 10% of its population.

Geography
The Great Famine was restricted to Northern Europe, including the British Isles, Northern France, the Low Countries, Scandinavia, Germany, and western Poland. It also affected some of the Baltic states except for the far eastern Baltic, which was affected only indirectly. The famine was bounded to the south by the Alps and the Pyrenees.

Consequences
The Great Famine is noteworthy for the number of people who died, the vast geographic area that was affected, its length, and its lasting consequences.

Church

Nearly all human societies at this time attributed natural disasters as being divine retribution for their apparent misdeeds. In a society whose final recourse for nearly all problems had been religion, and Roman Catholicism was the only tolerated Christian faith, no amount of prayer seemed effective against the root causes of the famine. Thus the famine undermined the institutional authority of the Roman Catholic Church, and helped lay the foundations for later movements that were deemed heretical by the Roman Catholic Church, as they opposed the papacy and blamed the perceived failure of prayer upon corruption and doctrinal errors within the Roman Catholic Church.

Cultural
Medieval Europe in the 14th century had already experienced widespread social violence, and even acts then punishable by death such as rape and murder were demonstrably far more common (especially relative to the population size), compared with modern times. 

The famine led to a stark increase in crime, even among those not normally inclined to criminal activity, because people would resort to any means to feed themselves or their families. For the next several decades after the famine, Europe took on a tougher and more violent edge. It became an even less amicable place than during the 12th and the 13th centuries. This could be seen across all segments of society, perhaps most strikingly in the way warfare was conducted in the 14th century during the Hundred Years' War, when chivalry ended, as opposed to the 12th and the 13th centuries when nobles were more likely to die by accident in tournament games than on the field of battle.

The famine undermined confidence in medieval governments, due to their failure to deal with its resulting crises. This had particularly dire consequences for Edward II, who was already an unpopular monarch. The famine in England was therefore primarily seen as divine retribution for the perceived misrule of the king as opposed to alleged misconduct within the Church, and contributed to his eventual downfall.

Population
The Great Famine marked a clear end to a period of unprecedented population growth that had started circa 1050. Although some believe growth had already been slowing down for a few decades, the famine was undoubtedly a clear end of high population growth. The Great Famine later had consequences for future events in the 14th century, such as the Black Death, when an already weakened population would be struck again.

See also
 Popular revolts in late-medieval Europe
 List of famines

Notes

Further reading
 Aberth, John From the Brink of the Apocalypse: Confronting Famine, Plague, War and Death in the Later Middle Ages, 2000, Chapter 1, dealing with the Great Famine, is available online.
 
 
  (The first book on the subject, it is the most comprehensive treatment.)
 
 Kershaw, Ian, "The Great Famine and Agrarian Crisis in England 1315–1322", Past & Present, 59, pp. 3–50 (May 1973). Available online from JSTOR. Second most widely cited article.
 Lucas, Henry S. "The great European Famine of 1315–7", Speculum, Vol. 5, No. 4. (Oct., 1930), pp. 343–377. Available online from JSTOR. The first (in English) and most widely cited article on the Great Famine.
  (general audience)

Famines in Europe
1310s in Europe
Medieval society
14th-century health disasters
14th-century famines
Volcanic winters
Incidents of cannibalism
Cannibalism in Europe